The Tittot Glass Art Museum is a museum about glass art in Beitou District, Taipei, Taiwan. It is the first museum in Taiwan dedicated to glass art.

History
The museum was established in 1999.

Architecture
The museum spans over two floors. The ground floor displays various home-made artifacts and the upper floor displays the history of glass art and live display.

Transportation
The museum is accessible within walking distance northeast from Guandu Station of the Taipei Metro.

See also
 List of museums in Taiwan

References

External links
 

1999 establishments in Taiwan
Art museums and galleries in Taiwan
Glass museums in Taiwan
Museums established in 1999
Museums in Taipei